Tomáš Bokroš (born 19 June 1989) is a Slovak professional ice hockey defenceman who currently plays professionally for MHk 32 Liptovský Mikuláš of the Slovak Extraliga.

Career statistics

Regular season and playoffs

References

External links

1989 births
Living people
Slovak ice hockey defencemen
LHK Jestřábi Prostějov players
VHK Vsetín players
HKM Zvolen players
MsHK Žilina players
ŠHK 37 Piešťany players
HK Dukla Trenčín players
Södertälje SK players
HC Dynamo Pardubice players
HK Dukla Michalovce players
HK Poprad players
MHk 32 Liptovský Mikuláš players
Sportspeople from Trenčín
Slovak expatriate ice hockey players in the Czech Republic
Slovak expatriate ice hockey players in Sweden